Ngāti Kauwhata is a Māori iwi (tribe) of New Zealand. In the 2013 New Zealand census, 1,401 people listed Ngāti Kauwhata as their iwi. 
Ko ruahine te Maunga
Ko Oroua te Awa.
Ko Tainui te Waka.
Ko Ngati Kauwhata te iwi.
Ko Kauwhata Marae.

Ngāti Kauwhata has a marae just south of Feilding.

References

Iwi and hapū